John Baker (born 1942 Kingston upon Hull, England) is a British author. To date, he has published ten novels, many of them set in either Hull or York.

Bibliography
 Poet in the Gutter (1995)
 Death Minus Zero (1996)
 King of the Streets (1998)
 Walking with Ghosts (1999)
 The Chinese Girl (2000)
 Shooting in the Dark (2001)
 The Meanest Flood (2003)
 White Skin Man (2004)
 Winged with Death (2009)
 Thanksgiving: The Biography of an American Holiday (2009)

Current project
Baker's latest novel is entitled Winged with Death, and deals with time and tango and revolution. Set simultaneously in Montevideo in the 1970s and the north of England in the present time, the plot revolves around abduction and denial. Winged with Death was published by Flambard Press in March 2009.

Blogging
Baker comments on the crafts of writing and reading, film, politics, theatre, music, and general cultural topics on johnbakersblog .
He is also a member of the 9rules  writing community, and has contributed to newcritics .

External links

Official site

1942 births
20th-century English novelists
21st-century English novelists
20th-century English male writers
21st-century English male writers
Living people
English male novelists
Writers from Kingston upon Hull